Castanidium elegans is a species of cercozoans in the family Castanellidae. It is found in the Sargasso Sea and in the current around the Canary Islands.

References

External links 

 

Phaeodaria
Species described in 1908